The Mid-American Conference women's soccer tournament is the conference championship tournament in women's soccer for the Mid-American Conference (MAC). The tournament has been held every year since 1997. It is a single-elimination tournament that features the conference's top six teams, with seeding based on regular season records. The winner receives the conference's automatic bid to the NCAA Division I women's soccer championship. The Toledo Rockets and Bowling Green Falcons have won the most championships through 2020, having won five titles.

Format
The top six teams from the regular season qualify for the tournament and are seeded based on the order of finish in the conference play. The teams are then placed in a single-elimination bracket, with the top seed playing the lowest seed, until meeting in a final championship game. The tournament begins in late October at campus sites and concludes in early November at the highest remaining seed's home field.
Prior to 2020 the tournament consisted of eight teams, and for the 2020 season was the top team of the East Division vs the top team in the West Division.

Champions

By year

Source: issuu.com

By school
Championship game appearances and records as of the 2021 tournament.

References

 
Mid-American Conference women's soccer